Ralph Donald Stewart (born December 2, 1948) is a Canadian former professional ice hockey player who played 251 games in the National Hockey League with the Vancouver Canucks and New York Islanders between 1970 and 1978. Stewart also spent several years playing in the minor league Central Hockey League.

Career statistics

Regular season and playoffs

External links 

1948 births
Canadian ice hockey centres
Fort Worth Texans players
Fort Worth Wings players
Ice hockey people from Ontario
Houston Apollos players
Kansas City Blues players
Living people
Montreal Junior Canadiens players
New York Islanders players
Seattle Totems (WHL) players
Sportspeople from Thunder Bay
Tidewater Wings players
Tulsa Oilers (1964–1984) players
Vancouver Canucks players
Vancouver Canucks (WHL) players